Hanging Glacier is in North Cascades National Park in the U.S. state of Washington, on the north slopes of Mount Shuksan. Hanging Glacier is connected to Crystal Glacier at its uppermost margin, and also flows into Upper Curtis Glacier. Hanging Glacier is along the route taken in the first technical ascent of Mount Shuksan in 1939.

See also
List of glaciers in the United States

References

Glaciers of the North Cascades
Glaciers of Whatcom County, Washington
Glaciers of Washington (state)